The Wisconsin Motor Manufacturing Company of Milwaukee, Wisconsin, has been manufacturing internal combustion engines since 1909. In its early years Wisconsin made a full range of engines for automobiles, trucks, heavy construction machines, and maritime use. After 1930 it focused on small air-cooled engines widely used in agriculture and construction machines.

Wisconsin Engines (previously, Wisconsin Motors) continues to manufacture high quality engines.

History 
March 12, 1909 Wisconsin Motor was incorporated by Charles H. John and Arthur F. Milbrath. By 1912 they employed about 300 people. 
1937 Wisconsin Motor merged with Continental Motors Company but retained a separate identity. 
1940 V series V4 engines introduced
1965 Ryan Aeronautical bought 50 per cent of Continental Motors Corporation
1969 Teledyne Technologies bought Continental Motors Corporation
1971 Fuji Heavy Industries, owner of Subaru, appointed Teledyne Wisconsin Motor US agents for their Robin engines
1992 Teledyne Total Power sold out to Nesco Incorporated
2010 Hydrogen Engine Center, Inc. and Wisconsin Motors Sign a Joint Venture
September 30, 2017 Subaru Corporation ended production of small engines.

Products

Small air-cooled engines 
Wisconsin's fame came from its small air-cooled engines, such as AEH (used on generators, garden tractors, skidsteers tractors), AEN, and VF4. In the 1950s they were able to claim they were the world's largest manufacturer of heavy-duty air-cooled engines. There were single, inline two, V-two, and V-four cylinder models. The engines were designed for outdoor field service in industries including agriculture, construction, marine, oil-field equipment and railway maintenance. There are a wide range of variations in each engine family, including displacement, vertical and horizontal crankshafts, power ratings, and fuel used. Fuels can be gasoline, heating oil, kerosene, LPG, and CNG.

Engines for cars and trucks 
New automobile companies bought them for their big cars. The Stutz Bearcat car was available with either Wisconsin's four-cylinder Type A or their six-cylinder engine. Both engines were rated at 60 horsepower. Stutz began to build their own engines in 1917. Pierce-Arrow was among other customers for Wisconsin engines. Wisconsin engines also powered the trucks made by The FWD Corporation. Between 1945 and 1965 King Midget Cars used a Wisconsin AENL single cylinder engine in their micro car.

Engines for construction equipment 
Their four and six cylinder engines were used in heavy construction equipment including Bucyrus-Erie and Marion drag-lines and shovels.

References

External links
 Publication reprints at VintageMachinery.org
 Wisconsin Motors at Pitt Auto Electric Co.

Engine manufacturers of the United States
Manufacturing companies established in 1909
Motor vehicle engine manufacturers
1909 establishments in Wisconsin
American companies established in 1909
Defunct manufacturing companies based in Milwaukee